Argyresthia freyella is a moth of the  family Yponomeutidae. It is found in North America, including Arkansas, British Columbia, Kentucky, Minnesota, Mississippi, New York, Ohio, Tennessee, Texas and Missouri.

The wingspan is about 8–9 mm. The forewings are golden yellow, mottled with silver-white. The hindwings are pale ochreous fuscous.

The larvae feed on Juniperus virginiana. They mine the leaves of their host plant. The larvae are green. Pupation takes place in a whitish spindle-shaped cocoon with brown spotting which is attached to the outside surface of the foliage included in the web.

References

Moths described in 1890
Argyresthia
Moths of North America